A general election was held in the United Kingdom on Thursday 10 October 1974 and all 71 seats in Scotland were contested.

MPs 
List of MPs for constituencies in Scotland (October 1974–1979)

Results

Votes summary

References 

 

1974 in Scotland
1970s elections in Scotland
October 1974
Scotland